Romana Film was an Italian film production company. Founded in 1946 by the Sicilian Fortunato Misiano, the company was based in Rome. It made films in a variety of popular genres such as Swashbucklers, Peplum and Eurospy films, turning out roughly a hundred films before the company ceased production in the late 1960s.

Selected filmography
 Baron Carlo Mazza (1948)
 What Price Innocence? (1952)
 Heads or Tails (1969)

References

Italian film studios
Film production companies of Italy
Mass media companies established in 1946
Mass media in Rome
Italian companies established in 1946